Cho Yong-nam is a North Korean former footballer. He represented North Korea on at least two occasions between 1989 and 1991.

Career statistics

International

References

Date of birth unknown
Living people
North Korean footballers
North Korea international footballers
Association football midfielders
Year of birth missing (living people)